"Drop a Beat" is a song by American electronica musician Moby, released in May 1992 as the second single from his self-titled debut album. The single peaked at number six on the Billboard Hot Dance Club Play chart.

Track listing

Charts

References

External links 
 

Moby songs
1992 singles
Songs written by Moby
Techno songs
1992 songs
Instinct Records singles